Lincoln is a city in Logan County, Illinois, United States. First settled in the 1830s, it is the only town in the United States that was named for Abraham Lincoln before he became president; he practiced law there from 1847 to 1859. Lincoln is home to one college - Lincoln Christian University - and two prisons. It is also the home of the world's largest covered wagon and numerous other historical sites along the Route 66 corridor.

The population was 13,288 at the 2020 census.  It is the county seat of Logan County.

History
The town was officially named on August 27, 1853, in an unusual ceremony. Abraham Lincoln, having assisted with the platting of the town and working as counsel for the newly laid Chicago & Mississippi Railroad which led to its founding, was asked to participate in a naming ceremony for the town. On this date, the first sale of lots took place in the new town. Ninety were sold at prices ranging from $40 to $150. According to tradition Lincoln was present. At noon he purchased two watermelons and carried one under each arm to the public square. There he invited Latham, Hickox, and Gillette, proprietors, to join him, saying, "Now we'll christen the new town," squeezing watermelon juice out on the ground.  Legend has it that when it had been proposed to him that the town be named for him, he had advised against it, saying that in his experience, "Nothing bearing the name of Lincoln ever amounted to much." The town of Lincoln was the first city named after Abraham Lincoln, while he was a lawyer and before he was President of the United States.

Lincoln College (chartered Lincoln University), a private four-year liberal arts college, was founded in early 1865 and granted 2 year degrees until 1929.  News of the establishment and name of the school was communicated to President Lincoln shortly before his death, making Lincoln the only college to be named after Lincoln while he was living. The College had an excellent collection of Abraham Lincoln–related documents and artifacts, housed in a museum which is open to the general public.

The City of Lincoln was located directly on U.S. Route 66 from 1926 through 1978.  This is its secondary tourist theme after the connection with Abraham Lincoln.

American author Langston Hughes spent one year of his youth in Lincoln. Later on, he was to write to his eighth-grade teacher in Lincoln, telling her his writing career began there in the eighth grade, when he was elected class poet.

American theologians Reinhold Niebuhr and Helmut Richard Niebuhr lived in Lincoln from 1902 through their college years. Reinhold Niebuhr first served as pastor of a church when he served as interim minister of Lincoln's St. John's German Evangelical Synod church following his father's death. Reinhold Niebuhr is best known as the author of the Serenity Prayer.

The City of Lincoln features the stone, three-story, domed Logan County Courthouse (1905). This courthouse building replaced the earlier Logan County Courthouse (built 1858) where Lincoln once practiced law; the earlier building had fallen into serious decay and could not be saved.  In addition, the Postville Courthouse State Historic Site contains a 1953 replica of the original 1840 Logan County courthouse; Postville, the original county seat, lost its status in 1848 and was itself annexed into Lincoln in the 1860s.

Lincoln was also the site of the Lincoln Developmental Center (LDC); a state institution for the developmentally disabled. Founded in 1877, the institution was one of Logan County's largest employers until closed in 2002 by former Governor George Ryan due to concerns about patient maltreatment. Despite efforts by some Illinois state legislators to reopen LDC, the facility remains shuttered.

Geography

I-55 (formerly U.S. Route 66) connects Lincoln to Bloomington and Springfield. Illinois Route 10 and Illinois Route 121 run into the city. Amtrak serves Lincoln Station daily with its Lincoln Service and Texas Eagle routes. Service consists of four Lincoln Service round-trips between Chicago and St. Louis, and one Texas Eagle round-trip between San Antonio and Chicago. Three days a week, the Eagle continues on to Los Angeles. Lines of the Union Pacific and Canadian National railroads run through the city. Salt Creek (Sangamon River Tributary) and the Edward R. Madigan State Fish and Wildlife Area are nearby.

Climate

Lincoln has a humid continental climate (Köppen: Dfa). There are 126 days below freezing while there are 24 days above .

Demographics

According to the 2010 United States Census, Lincoln had 14,504 people.  Among non-Hispanics this includes 13,262 White (91.4%), 528 Black (3.6%), 118 Asian (0.8%), and 227 from two or more races.  The Hispanic or Latino population included 336 people (2.3%).

There were 5,877 households, out of which 29.1% had children under the age of 18 living with them, 41.1% were married couples living together, 8.4% had a female householder with children & no husband present, and 40.1% were non-families. 33.9% of all households were made up of individuals, and 29.7% had someone who was 65 years of age or older. The average household size was 2.25 and the average family size was 2.83.

The population was spread out, with 78.5% over the age of 18 and 17.6% who were 65 years of age or older. The median age was 38.0 years. The gender ratio was 47.9% male & 52.1% female.  Among 5,877 occupied households, 64.6% were owner-occupied & 35.4% were renter-occupied.

As of the census of 2000, there were 15,369 people, 5,965 households, and 3,692 families residing in the town. The racial makeup of the city was 94.79% White, 2.82% African American, 0.16% Native American, 0.89% Asian, 0.03% Pacific Islander, 0.45% from other races, and 0.86% from two or more races. Hispanic or Latino of any race were 1.19% of the population.

There were 5,965 households, out of which 28.4% had children under the age of 18 living with them, 46.7% were married couples living together, 11.6% had a female householder with no husband present, and 38.1% were non-families. 33.1% of all households were made up of individuals, and 15.8% had someone living alone who was 65 years of age or older. The average household size was 2.28 and the average family size was 2.89.

The town's population is spread out, with 21.6% under the age of 18, 13.8% from 18 to 24, 26.4% from 25 to 44, 21.5% from 45 to 64, and 16.7% who were 65 years of age or older. The median age was 37 years. For every 100 females, there were 90.8 males. For every 100 females age 18 and over, there were 86.9 males.

The median income for a household in the town was $34,435, and the median income for a family was $45,171. Males had a median income of $33,596 versus $22,500 for females. The per-capita income for the town is $17,207. About 8.5% of families and 10.7% of the population were below the poverty line, including 13.9% of those under age 18 and 8.7% of those age 65 or over.

Economy
The United States Postal Service operates the Lincoln Post Office.

The Illinois Department of Corrections Logan Correctional Center is located in unincorporated Logan County, near Lincoln.

Cresco Labs opened their cultivation site there and has since replaced over 250 jobs lost when the bottle factory closed down. The farm has shown to be an integral factor in Lincoln’s economy.

Education
Lincoln Christian University
Lincoln Community High School

Notable people

 Scott Altman, NASA astronaut and space shuttle Columbia commander
 Brian Cook, forward for five NBA teams
 Henry Darger, writer and artist
 William D. Gayle, Illinois State Representative and Mayor of Lincoln
 Langston Hughes, poet, novelist, playwright
 Terry Kinney, actor, cofounder of the Steppenwolf Theatre Company
 David T. Littler, Illinois state legislator and lawyer
 Edward R. Madigan, U.S. Secretary of Agriculture (1991–1993), congressman (1973–1991)
 Robert Madigan, Illinois State Senator
 William Keepers Maxwell, Jr., author; his 1979 novel So Long, See You Tomorrow is set in Lincoln
 Kelly McEvers, journalist and correspondent for NPR
 Alberta Nichols, composer for Broadway, radio and films of the 1920s, 30s and 40s
 H. Richard Niebuhr, prominent American theologian, brother of Reinhold Niebuhr
 Reinhold Niebuhr, prominent American theologian and author of Serenity Prayer, brother of H. Richard Niebuhr
 Stella Pevsner, children's book author
 Clifford Quisenberry, Illinois State Representative
 Rip Ragan, MLB pitcher for the Cincinnati Reds
 Dick Reichle, MLB outfielder for the Boston Red Sox
 Bill Sampen, former Major League baseball pitcher
 Kevin Seitzer, former Major League Baseball player
 Tony Semple, former National Football League player
 Willis R. Shaw, Illinois state senator
 John Schlitt, lead singer of Christian rock band Petra
 Larry Tagg, rock musician, songwriter, teacher, and historian
 John Turner Illinois State Representative and judge
 Emil Verban, MLB second baseman for the St. Louis Cardinals, Philadelphia Phillies, Chicago Cubs and Boston Braves
 Dennis Werth, MLB first baseman for the New York Yankees and Kansas City Royals

References

External links

 https://web.archive.org/web/20091027001639/http://geocities.com/findinglincolnillinois/
 http://www.lincolnil.gov
 http://www.lincolnparkdistrict.com/
 http://www.lincolnpubliclibrary.org/
 http://lchs.k12.il.us/

 
Cities in Logan County, Illinois
Micropolitan areas of Illinois
Cities in Illinois
County seats in Illinois
Populated places established in 1853
1853 establishments in Illinois
Abraham Lincoln